Catherine Benguigui (born 1964) is a French actress and television personality.

Personal life
She is the daughter of Elie Benguigui.

Television

Radio

Filmography

References

External links 

1964 births
French television actresses
French people of Algerian-Jewish descent
French film actresses
Living people
20th-century French actresses
21st-century French actresses